Love Devotion Surrender is an album released in 1973 by guitarists Carlos Santana and John McLaughlin, with the backing of their respective bands, Santana and The Mahavishnu Orchestra. The album was inspired by the teachings of Sri Chinmoy and intended as a tribute to John Coltrane. It contains two Coltrane compositions, two McLaughlin songs, and a traditional gospel song arranged by Santana and McLaughlin. It was certified Gold in 1973.

In 2003, Love Devotion Surrender was released on CD with alternate versions as bonus tracks.

Santana and McLaughlin toured in 1973 and 1974 to support the album.

Background
Both men were recent disciples of the guru Sri Chinmoy, and the title of the album echoes basic concepts of Chinmoy's philosophy, which focused on "love, devotion and surrender". Chinmoy spoke about the album and the concept of surrender: 

For both men the album came at a transitional moment spiritually and musically: Love Devotion Surrender was a "very public pursuit of their spiritual selves." Carlos Santana was moving from rock toward jazz and fusion, experiencing a "spiritual awakening", while McLaughlin was about to experience the break-up of the Mahavishnu Orchestra after being criticized by other band members. Santana had been a fan of McLaughlin, and McLaughlin had introduced Santana to Sri Chinmoy in 1971, at which time the guru bestowed the name "Devadip" on him, and the two had started playing and recording together in 1972. According to his biographer Marc Shapiro, Santana had much to learn from McLaughlin: "He would sit for hours, enthralled at the new ways to play that McLaughlin was teaching him," and his new spirituality had its effect on the music: "the feeling was that Carlos's newfound faith was present in every groove."

Tracks
The first track, "A Love Supreme", is a version of the Coltrane composition "Acknowledgement" from the 1964 landmark album A Love Supreme. It features McLaughlin and Santana, both playing electric guitar, in an extended, improvised trading of bars. For the most part, Santana is panned to the left channel and McLaughlin to the right. As with the original, toward the end a chant of "A love supreme" is heard. (Only Armando Peraza is credited as a singer.)

"Naima" is another Coltrane composition, played on acoustic guitar. First appearing in 1959 on Coltrane's Giant Steps, it is a gentle song played in a straightforward manner.

"The Life Divine" again returns to Coltrane's A Love Supreme, opening with the chanted phrase "the love divine." The song's first part is extensive, high-tempo improvisation by Santana, alternating between quick phrases and long, sustained notes (including one that runs from 3:29 to 4:03). Midway through the song and introduced by the "life divine" chant, McLaughlin takes over with mostly high-speed staccato bursts and riffs. The chant returns, incorporating "it's yours and mine", and Larry Young's organ, with percussion, provide the outro.

"Let Us Go Into the House of the Lord" is a 16-minute-long track based on the traditional gospel song. The arrangement was credited to Santana and McLaughlin but Bob Palmer in Rolling Stone wrote that the arrangement is close enough to Lonnie Liston Smith's "to be described as a cop". Smith's arrangement was recorded in 1970 when he worked with Pharoah Sanders, who had recorded and worked closely with Coltrane. After the slow introductory statement (the part which resembles Smith's arrangement), most of the piece consists of soloing over two chords accompanied by a loping bass and Latin percussion. Of Larry Young's organ contribution here, Paul Stump, in Go Ahead John, wrote: "with its overlapping flurries of triplets, [it] is a moment of pure genius, worthy of mention in its own right, a musical equivalent of a swarm of surreally coloured butterflies." The track closes with a return to the slow introductory statement.

The final track, "Meditation", is a "pretty but light McLaughlin composition" that McLaughlin had previously recorded as a solo for exclusive use by the New York radio station WNEW-FM.  McLaughlin plays piano, and Santana the acoustic guitar, on Love Devotion Surrender'''s version of the tune.

Critical reception

Criticism of the compositions and their execution is varied. In addition to noting the resemblance of "Let Us Go" to Smith's arrangement, Bob Palmer referred to the "superficial treatments" of Coltrane material, while Paul Stump, author of Go Ahead John, a McLaughlin biography, is negative about the album's execution and direction, saying it was, "in retrospect, a spiritually-hobbled album", criticizing Santana's tone and McLaughlin's "technophiliac tendencies" and "electronic gimmickry", and a "plink-plonk conga-heavy foursquare vamp all too typical of Santana" in "A Love Supreme". Thom Jurek is much more positive, praising, for instance, "The Life Divine" as "insanely knotty yet intervallically transcendent."

Fans of Santana were, apparently, disappointed; according to Thom Jurek, Love Devotion Surrender was a "hopelessly misunderstood record in its time by Santana fans", though Marc Shapiro's biography of Santana suggests otherwise.

Thom Jurek, reviewing the album for AllMusic, praises the album highly: "After three decades, Love Devotion Surrender still sounds completely radical and stunningly, movingly beautiful." Robert Palmer, writing for Rolling Stone, is ambivalent about the album, calling it "loud and insistent...depend[ent] on monochord drones and simple modes for its structure and on sheer screaming force for much of its effect." He thinks more highly of Carlos Santana's playing than of McLaughlin's, which he suggests lacks feeling and relies on technicality: "Here, at his most inspired, McLaughlin is exhilarating if a bit monolithic." Later, in a positive review of Santana's Welcome (1973), Palmer said the album "was simply a series of ecstatic jams on Coltrane and Coltrane-influenced material."

Many reviewers praise organist Larry Young. Thom Jurek says Young is the gel that holds the two very different guitar players together; Robert Palmer says "that the sensitive organ solos on Love Devotion Surrender were the best things on that album."

Remix
In 2001, Bill Laswell, responsible for remixes of albums by Bob Marley and Miles Davis, mixed and remixed excerpts of Santana's Illuminations and Love Devotion Surrender, on an album called Divine Light''.

Track listing

Personnel
 Mahavishnu John McLaughlin – guitar, piano
 Carlos Santana – guitar
 Mahalakshmi Eve McLaughlin – piano
 Larry Young (under his Muslim name Khalid Yasin) – piano, organ
 Doug Rauch – bass guitar
 Jan Hammer – Hammond organ, drums, percussion
 Billy Cobham – drums, percussion
 Don Alias – drums, percussion
 Mike Shrieve – drums, percussion
 Mingo Lewis – percussion
 Armando Peraza – congas, percussion, vocals

Production 
 Mahavishnu John McLaughlin – producer
 Carlos Santana – producer
 Glen Kolotkin – engineer
 Ashok – album design & cover photo
 Pranavananda – photography
 Sri Chinmoy – essay

Charts

References

Santana (band) albums
Mahavishnu Orchestra albums
1973 albums
Albums produced by Carlos Santana
Columbia Records albums
John Coltrane tribute albums
Carlos Santana albums